Herbertus borealis is a species of liverwort in the family Herbertaceae known as northern prongwort. It was described in 1970 by Alan Crundwell. It is endemic to Scotland, where it is found only in the Beinn Eighe nature reserve, and lives in dwarf shrub heath alongside other large liverworts such as Anastrophyllum donnianum, Bazzania tricrenata and Pleurozia purpurea. A closely related species, described in 2012 as Herbertus norenus and known as "Viking prongwort", is known from Shetland and Norway and was formerly confused with H. borealis.

References

External links

Jungermanniales
Least concern plants
Plants described in 1970
Endemic flora of Scotland
Taxonomy articles created by Polbot